Wat Pa Phon Phao, also Wat Phon Phao, Wat Phonphao, or Wat Phol Phao, meaning "Peacefulness Temple", is a Buddhist temple situated on a hill in the southeast of Luang Prabang, Laos, across the Nam Khan River from Luang Prabang Airport. The temple, a golden stupa, is used as a forest meditation retreat, and was once headed by the abbot Ajahn Saisamut, a noted Lao Buddhist teacher. His funeral in 1992 was one of the largest funeral services Laos had ever seen. The temple has a fine collection of murals, some of them gruesome in nature.

References

External links
Photograph
Photographs of murals

Buddhist temples in Laos
Buildings and structures in Luang Prabang